Agaricus perobscurus, commonly known collectively with its close European relative Agaricus lanipes as the princess, is a basidiomycete fungus. A relative of Agaricus augustus, known as the prince, A. perobscurus can be differentiated in several aspects. While the prince is widely distributed in North America, the princess is found only in the San Francisco Bay Area. Besides its smaller size, it is distinguished from Agaricus augustus by a darker-brown cap, a patchy fibrillose stipe surface at youth, lacking densely floccose-scaly, and a different fruiting season. Another commonly closely associated Agaricus species, Agaricus praeclaresquamosus, is toxic. It can be differentiated by its dark-grey cap, a phenolic, rather than an anise odor, and a stipe base which yellows immediately when injured.

Description
The cap is  broad, and becomes deeply convex to flattened. The surface is dry, with a uniformly dark-brown disc. The disc can be either flattened or depressed, and is appressed fibrillose-squamulose. Towards the margin, it begins to diffuse. It is brown over a pallid ground color. Meanwhile, the margin is incurved in youth, then decurved, and eventually turns straight or slightly raised. The cap cuticle bruises slowly tawny-brown, and yellows in KOH. When injured, it can change to a cream color to tawny. The odor is that of anise, with a mild taste.

The gills are free, close, and relatively broad. When young, they have a whitish color, though they turn blackish-brown at maturity. The gills can be either five or six-seried.

Often tapered to a bulbous base, it can be stuffed to hollow at maturity. The surface of apex is white, and silky-striate. The lower portion is white, with the fibrils forming scattered appressed squamules. In contrast, the base of the stipe discolors slowly a dull orange-brown where handled. The flesh changes sporadically from a cream-yellow to tawny-brown when injured or cut. The partial veil is white, membranous, and has small brown floccose scales concentrated near the margin. The annulus is thin and pendulous on the stipe.

The spores are 6.5–8.0 μm by 4.5–5.0 μm, smooth, thick-walled, and ellipsoid. They are inequilateral in profile, without a conspicuous hilar appendage. Their germ pore is not evident, and the spore print is a blackish-brown color.

Habitat
Agaricus perobscurus is often solitary or in small groups under conifers and hardwoods. Primarily found in urban parks with trees like Monterey Cypress, Monterey Pine, and Eucalyptus, they fruit in North America from mid to late winter.

See also
List of Agaricus species

References

Specific

perobscurus
Fungi described in 1985
Fungi of North America